The discography of Kay One, a rapper from Ravensburg, Germany, also known as "Prince Kay One".

Studio albums

Collaboration albums

Singles

As lead artist

Collaboration singles

As featured performer

Free tracks

References

Discographies of German artists